TKA is a Latin Freestyle trio that was prominent in the 1980s and early 1990s.

TKA may refer to:

Techno Kitten Adventure, an indie game where players control a flying kitten that must avoid obstacles and distractions timed to techno music
The King's Academy (West Palm Beach, Florida), West Palm Beach, Florida, United States
The Kluger Agency, a full service non-traditional advertising agency in Beverly Hills, California, United States
Total knee arthroplasty, a surgical procedure for the knee
Trinidad Karate Association, the largest active organization teaching traditional Japanese Shotokan karate in Trinidad and Tobago